Rousettus bat coronavirus HKU9 (HKU9-1) is an enveloped, positive-sense, single-stranded RNA mammalian Group 2 Betacoronavirus discovered in Rousettus bats in China in 2011. This strain of coronavirus is closely related to the EMC/2012 strain found in London which is related to the Middle East respiratory syndrome-related coronavirus (MERS-CoV). The MERS-CoV species is responsible for the 2012 Middle East respiratory syndrome coronavirus outbreak in Saudi Arabia, Jordan, United Arab Emirates, the United Kingdom, France, and Italy.

Transmission
The exact means of transmission to humans is not yet well known. However, it has been demonstrated that betaCoV's including HKU4 have the propensity to recombine and cause interspecies transmission. However, this is not seen in Group C betacoronaviruses to which MERS-CoV is most closely related.

See also
 Severe acute respiratory syndrome
 Tylonycteris
 Pipistrellus
 Human coronavirus HKU1
 Human coronavirus OC43
 Pipistrellus bat coronavirus HKU5
 Severe acute respiratory syndrome coronavirus 2 SARS-CoV-2
 RNA virus
 Positive/negative-sense
 Animal viruses

References

External links
 London1-nCoV-2012 phylogenetic tree
 Coronaviruses
 Viralzone: Betacoronavirus
 Virus Pathogen Database and Analysis Resource (ViPR): Coronaviridae

Betacoronaviruses
Animal viral diseases
Bat diseases
Bat virome